Wharton is a civil parish in the Eden District, Cumbria, England. It contains three listed buildings that are recorded in the National Heritage List for England.  Of these, one is listed at Grade I, the highest of the three grades, and the others are at Grade II, the lowest grade.  The parish is almost entirely rural, and the listed buildings consist of a ruined tower house, a medieval house, and a farmhouse.


Key

Buildings

References

Citations

Sources

Lists of listed buildings in Cumbria
Eden District